Benedetto Caetani (or Gaetani) may refer to:

Pope Boniface VIII, born Benedetto Caetani (died 1303)
Benedetto Caetani (died 1296), cardinal, nephew of Boniface VIII
Benedict of Porto e Santa Rufina (died 1216), cardinal, sometimes called Caetani

See also
Caetani (surname)